A list of films produced by the Marathi language film industry based in Maharashtra in the year 1952.

1952 Releases
A list of Marathi films released in 1952.

References

External links
Gomolo - 

Lists of 1952 films by country or language
 Marathi
1952